Wüst Inlet is an ice-filled inlet, from  wide, indenting the east side of Merz Peninsula between Cape Christmas and Old Mans Head, along the east coast of Palmer Land. The inlet was photographed from the air in 1940 by members of the United States Antarctic Service (USAS). During 1947 the inlet was photographed from the air by members of the Ronne Antarctic Research Expedition (RARE), who in conjunction with the Falkland Islands Dependencies Survey (FIDS) charted it from the ground. Named by the FIDS for Professor Georg Wüst, a German oceanographer.

References

Inlets of Palmer Land